Miss Meetei Chanu or Miss Meitei Chanu is an annual beauty pageant that is run by the Manipur based Lainingthou Sanamahi Sana Pung (LSSP). The event aims to make Meitei women understand the culture and tradition of Sanamahism (Meitei religion). It is one of the most watched beauty pageants in North East India. It co-exists with Miss Manipur, Femina Miss India Manipur and Miss Kangleipak.

Background 
The Miss Meetei Chanu beauty pageant was first held in 2016. It was organised by the Lainingthou Sanamahi Sana Pung (LSSP), a socio-religious group, based in Manipur, India. The event is organised under the guidance of Leishemba Sanajaoba, His Highness, the present titular king of Manipur. Besides being a beauty pageant, the event also includes cultural activities like cooking dishes, cleaning courtyards and serving elders in traditional ways.

"Our objective of the event is to preserve the age of traditions of the Meiteis and to make the younger generations aware of the culture and way of life so the earth preserved. 
The pageant is not to select only the beautiful girl, but to make them aware of the Meitei way of life, culture, tradition and religion and select the one who can present best the Meitei tradition as Meitei Chanu."
_ Tampak Puba, general publicity secretary of the organising committee said.

Many elements of the Meitei culture are included in the contest. The contestants are to prepare indigenous dishes in traditional way. The cooking utensils are earthen ones, following the old practices. Other than this, cleaning of courtyard and service to the old people are also the parts of the event.

"Our aim is to make Meitei girls and married women aware of our forefathers' religious way, culture and tradition."
_ Ishorjit Chandam, an organizer of the event said.

Special Awards 
Besides the overall top 3 awards, the following are the special awards.

Challenge Events 
The contest has both non-costume based as well as costume based events. Generally, the costume based events are performed later.

Non-costume based events 

The non-costume based events include the following rounds.

Costume-based events 
The costume based events include three rounds.

Recent Titleholders

References 

Beauty pageants in  Manipur
Beauty pageants in India

External links 

 
 
 

Meitei culture
Meitei folklore in popular culture
Beauty pageants in Manipur
Beauty pageants in India
Sanamahism